Marius Zarn (born 18 April 1978) is a retired footballer from Switzerland who played as midfielder.

Career
Zarn has spent most of his career playing for FC Vaduz, but had a brief spell in the Swiss Super League with FC Aarau.

Joining FC Chur 97 in 2008, he was appointed player-coach in 2010. He left the position in the summer 2014 after relegation. He was then immediately hired as a U15 coach at Bündner Fussballverband.

In the later years, he also worked as a youth coach at FC Triesen and head coach for FC Bad Ragaz, where he also played for the club's old boys team.

References

1978 births
Swiss men's footballers
Swiss football managers
Living people
FC Aarau players
Swiss expatriates in Liechtenstein
FC Vaduz players
Swiss expatriate footballers
Swiss expatriate sportspeople in Liechtenstein
FC Chur 97 players
Expatriate footballers in Liechtenstein
Association football midfielders